Tim Konings (born 17 October 1985 in Eindhoven) is a footballer who plays as a left back in the Eerste Divisie for Achilles '29. He formerly played first team football for SV Deurne and VV De Bataven. Konings is a PSV Eindhoven youth product.

References

External links
 Voetbal International profile 

1985 births
Living people
Dutch footballers
Association football defenders
Eerste Divisie players
Achilles '29 players
Footballers from Eindhoven